This is a list of roads designated M2:

Europe 
 M2 motorway (Great Britain), a motorway in England
 M2 expressway (Hungary), a motorway in Hungary
 N2 road (Ireland)#M2 motorway, a motorway in the Republic of Ireland
 M-2 highway (Montenegro), a motorway in Montenegro
 M2 motorway (Northern Ireland), a motorway in Northern Ireland
 Highway M02 (Ukraine)

Asia
 M2 motorway (Pakistan), a motorway in Pakistan
 M2 highway (Russia), a motorway in Russia

Africa
 M2 (Johannesburg), a Metropolitan Route in Johannesburg, South Africa
 M2 (Pretoria), a Metropolitan Route in Pretoria, South Africa

See also
 List of highways numbered 2

Australia

New South Wales 
 M2 Hills Motorway, a motorway in Sydney, Australia (part of the M2 route)
 Lane Cove Tunnel, a tunnel in Sydney
 M2 (Sydney), a motorway route in Sydney, Australia

Queensland 
 Ipswich Motorway and Logan Motorways in Brisbane, Australia

South Australia 
 Northern Expressway, in Adelaide, Australia
 Southern Expressway, in Adelaide, Australia

Victoria 
 Tullamarine Freeway in Melbourne, Australia
 CityLink Tollway in Melbourne, Australia

See also
List of highways numbered 2